This article is about music-related events in 1875.

Events 
 January 5 – Palais Garnier, home of the Paris Opera, designed by Charles Garnier, opens.
 March 3 – Georges Bizet's opera Carmen debuts, at the Opéra-Comique in Paris.
 May  – The score for the ballet Swan Lake is commissioned from Tchaikovsky (premiered in 1877).
 May 6 – Richard Wagner conducts portions of Götterdämmerung in concert in Vienna (the complete opera is premiered in 1876).
 August 23 – Composer Zdeněk Fibich marries operatic contralto Betty Hanušová, sister of his first wife Růžena Hanušová.
 October 25 – The first performance of Tchaikovsky's Piano Concerto No. 1 is given in Boston, Massachusetts, with Hans von Bülow as soloist.
 Robert Volkmann becomes professor of harmony and counterpoint at the National Academy of Music in Budapest, under Franz Liszt.

Published popular music 

 "All the Way My Savior Leads Me" w. Fanny Crosby m. Robert Lowry
 "Angels, Meet Me At the Cross Road"     w.m. Will Hays
 "Carve Dat Possum" by Sam Lucas & Herbert Hershy
 "Draw Me Nearer" w. Fanny Crosby m. William H. Doane
 "Dreaming Forever of Thee"      w.m. John Hill Hewitt
 "I'll Take You Home Again, Kathleen"     w.m. Thomas P. Westendorf
 "Myfanwy" w.m. Joseph Parry
 "Nancy Lee" w. Frederic Edward Weatherly, m. Stephen Adams (pseudonym of Michael Maybrick)
 "The Spelling Bee" w.m. Septimus Winner
 "Take me back to home and mother," w. by Arthur W. French, m. by William A. Huntley
 "To God Be the Glory" w. Fanny Crosby m. William H. Doane
 "A Warrior Bold" w. Edwin Thomas m. Stephen Adams (pseudonym of Michael Maybrick)
 "The Witches Flight (Galop Caprice)" by Henry M. Russell

Classical music 
 Johannes Brahms
Fifteen Liebeslieder for piano duet
String Quartet No. 3
 Antonín Dvořák
Moravian duets (for voices and piano)
Piano Quartet No. 1 
Piano Trio No. 1
Serenade for Strings
String Quintet (with double bass) (orig Op. 18)
Symphony No. 5
 Gabriel Fauré
 (for orchestra)
Suite for Orchestra
 (for chorus and orchestra)
 Edvard Grieg – incidental music to Ibsen's Peer Gynt
 Édouard Lalo – 
 Alexandre Luigini – Ballet égyptien
 Jules Massenet – oratorio Eve
 Modest Mussorgsky –  (Songs and Dances of Death), song cycle for bass voice and piano
 Amilcare Ponchielli – cantata 
 Nikolai Rimsky-Korsakov – String Quartet No. 1
 Camille Saint-Saëns
Piano Quartet, Op. 41
Piano Concerto No. 4, Op. 44
tone poem for orchestra Danse Macabre Op. 40
 Bedřich Smetana – Má vlast (My Country) – Six symphonic poems 
 Tchaikovsky
Symphony No. 3
Swan Lake (ballet, composition begun)

Opera 

 Carmen first performed in Paris.  Music by Georges Bizet and libretto by Henri Meilhac and Ludovic Halévy.
 Die Königin von Saba, music by Karl Goldmark and libretto by Salomon Mosenthal (at the Hofoper (now the State Opera) in Vienna, on 10 March 1875)
 Angelo, music by César Cui

Musical theater 

Gilbert & Sullivan – Trial By Jury
London production opens at the Royalty Theatre on March 25
Philadelphia production opens at the Arch Street Theatre on October 22
 The Zoo, Lyrics and Book: Bolton Rowe Music: Arthur Sullivan, London production opened at St. James Theatre on June 5

Births 
 February 2 – Fritz Kreisler, Austrian violinist and composer (d. 1962)
 February 8 – Georgette Leblanc, operatic soprano (d. 1941)
 February 26 – Richard Wetz, German composer
 February 28 – Viliam Figuš-Bystrý, Slovak composer
 March 7 – Maurice Ravel, French composer
 April 4 – Pierre Monteux, French conductor (d. 1964)
 April 5 – Mistinguett, actress and singer (d. 1956)
 May – Paul Sarebresole, ragtime composer (d. 1911)
 July 17 – Donald Tovey, composer and musicologist (d. 1940)
 August 9 – Albert Ketèlbey, composer (d. 1959)
 August 18 – Samuel Coleridge-Taylor, composer (d. 1912)

Deaths 
January 18 – Joseph Philbrick Webster, composer (b. 1819)
January 25 – Leopold Jansa, violinist, composer and music teacher (b. 1795)
February 1 – William Sterndale Bennett, composer (b. 1816)
February 23 – Louise Michaëli, opera singer (b. 1830)
March 3 – Adolf Reubke, organ builder (b. 1805)
March 15 – Christian Julius Hansen, composer (b. 1814)
March 17 – Ferdinand Laub, violinist (b. 1832)
March 19 – Jean-Baptiste Vuillaume, violin maker (b. 1798)
May 2 – Matthias Durst, violinist and composer (b. 1815)
June 3 – Georges Bizet, composer (b. 1838) (heart attack)
September 15 – Louise Farrenc, pianist and composer (b. 1804)
September 24 – William Walker, songwriter (b. 1809)

References

 
19th century in music
Music by year